Ruocco Park is a park in San Diego, in the U.S. state of California.

See also
 List of parks in San Diego

References

External links
 

Parks in San Diego